The Litin uezd was one of the uezds (uyezds or subdivisions) of the Podolian Governorate of the Russian Empire. It was situated in the northern part of the governorate. Its administrative centre was Lityn (Litin).

Demographics
At the time of the Russian Empire Census of 1897, Litinsky Uyezd had a population of 210,502. Of these, 83.1% spoke Ukrainian, 11.4% Yiddish, 3.0% Russian, 2.1% Polish and 0.1% Moldovan or Romanian as their native language.

References

 
Uezds of Podolia Governorate